Mabank Independent School District is a public school district based in Mabank, Texas (USA).

In addition to Mabank, the district serves southeast Kaufman, southwest Van Zandt, and northwest Henderson counties, including the community of Gun Barrel City and parts of Seven Points.

In 2009, the school district was rated "exemplary" by the Texas Education Agency.

 Mabank ISD had 3,509 students.

History
Lee Joffre, previously superintendent of Italy Independent School District, began work as Mabank ISD superintendent on January 7, 2019.

Schools

Secondary schools:
Mabank High School (grades 9-12)
Mabank Junior High School (grades 7-8)

Primary schools:
Mabank Intermediate School (grades 5-6)
Central Elementary School (PK-4)
Lakeview Elementary School (Kinder-4)
Southside Elementary School (PK-4)

References

External links
 

School districts in Kaufman County, Texas
School districts in Henderson County, Texas
School districts in Van Zandt County, Texas